Sumayya Vally (born 1990) is a Muslim, South African architect, and the founder and principal of the architecture and research firm, Counterspace. It is based between Johannesburg, South Africa and London, United Kingdom.

Early life and education 
Sumayya Vally was born in February 1990 in Pretoria, South Africa in the township of Laudium. She often cites the city of Johannesburg as her biggest source of inspiration, and it is a recurring theme in her works 

Vally completed her undergraduate studies in Architecture at the University of Pretoria, and went on to complete her master's degree at the University of the Witwatersrand in 2014.

Career 
In 2014, Sumayya Vally was admitted to the position of assistant curator and film producer for the South African Pavilion at La Biennale di Venezia. Between 2015 and 2020, she led the University of Johannesburg's Unit 12, An African Almanac, at the Graduate School of Architecture. The unit was founded by Professor Lesley Lokko, with the intent to create a curriculum for the African continent.

Alongside her teaching career, Sumayya Vally co-founded the experimental architecture and research firm, Counterspace in 2015.

In 2020, the firm was appointed to design the 20th Serpentine Pavilion, making Sumayya the youngest architect to be commissioned for this acclaimed annual temporary structure. Her conception of the Serpentine Pavilion, erected in 2021, is a response to the historical erasure and scarcity of informal community spaces across the city of London, and pays homage to existing and erased places that have held communities over time and continue to do so. 

Vally was included in the Time 100 Next list in 2021, which highlights 100 emerging leaders who are shaping the future. She was the only architect to make the list that year.

She was Pelli Distinguished Visiting professor at the University of Illinois Urbana-Champaign, a lecture series that brings internationally recognized architects together to serve as visiting lecturers each semester

In 2023, Vally artistically directed and co-curated the inaugural Islamic Arts Biennale in Jeddah, Saudi Arabia. The event brings together contemporary artists from across the world alongside rare artefacts, drawn together through the themes of Qiblah (direction) and Hijra (migration). That same year, she was appointed Honorary Professor of Practice at University College London’s The Bartlett School of Architecture. During her tenure, she will contribute to the Professional Practice Stream across The Bartlett School of Architecture and its Architecture MSci programme.

Awards and Honours

2023 

 Royal Academy Architecture Awards, Juror 
 OBEL Awards, Juror 
 Lexus Design Award, Mentor

2022 

 World Economic Forum, Young Global Leader 
 Moira Gemmill Prize for Emerging Architecture, Shortlist 
 The World Around: Young Climate Prize, Design Champion 
 Galerie’s 2022 Creative Minds 
 African Futures Institute: Academic Advisor 
 Dezeen’s Fifty Architects and Designers You Need to Know

2021 

 Graham Foundation Recipient 
 Rowan Moore’s Best Architecture of 2021 (Serpentine Pavilion) 
 Best architecture of the year, selected by Oliver Wainwright, The Guardian (Serpentine Pavilion) 
 TIME100 Next 
 artnet 25 Inspiring Women in the Art World 
 The Talks Emerging Masters 
 SOM Foundation Jury Member, European Research Prize 
 Dezeen Awards Jury Member

2020 

 Domus Best Architecture Firms 
 Architecture for a New Generation: Changemakers Manifestos, Design Museum 
 Serpentine Pavilion

References 

1990 births
Living people
South African architects
University of Pretoria alumni
University of the Witwatersrand alumni